Imperial Hotel or Hotel Imperial may refer to:

Hotels

Australia 
 Imperial Hotel, Ravenswood, Queensland
 Imperial Hotel, York, Western Australia

Austria 
 Hotel Imperial, Vienna

India
 The Imperial, New Delhi

Ireland
 Imperial Hotel, Dublin, destroyed during the 1916 Easter Rising

Japan
 Imperial Hotel (company), operator of a chain of hotels
 Imperial Hotel, Tokyo

New Zealand 
 Imperial Hotel, Auckland

Uganda 
 Imperial Hotels Group, a hotel conglomerate

United Kingdom 
 Imperial Hotel, Barrow-in-Furness, England
 Imperial Hotel, Blackpool, England
 Imperial Hotel, London, England

United States
 Imperial Hotel (Atlanta)
 Imperial Hotel (Thomasville, Georgia), historic building
 Imperial Hotel (California)
 Rockaway Beach Hotel (also called the Hotel Imperial), Rockaway Park, Queens, New York
 Imperial Hotel (Portland, Oregon)
 New Imperial Hotel (formerly the Imperial Hotel), Portland, Oregon
 Imperial Hotel (Greenville, South Carolina)

Entertainment
 "Imperial Hotel" (song), from the 1986 album Rock a Little by Stevie Nicks
 Hotel Imperial (1927 film)
 Hotel Imperial (1939 film)